The twenty-ninth season of the Case Closed anime was directed by Yasuichirō Yamamoto and produced by TMS Entertainment and Yomiuri Telecasting Corporation. The series is based on Gosho Aoyama's Case Closed manga series. In Japan, the series is titled  but was changed due to legal issues with the title Detective Conan. The series focuses on the adventures of teenage detective Shinichi Kudo who was turned into a child by a poison called APTX 4869, but continues working as a detective under the alias Conan Edogawa.

The episodes use four pieces of theme music: two openings and two endings.

The second opening theme is ANSWER by Only this time used for episodes 941 - 964 (season 30).

The second ending theme is Sissy Sky by Airi Miyakawa and starts at episode 952 and was used until episode 964 (season 30).

The season aired from January 5, 2019 to November 16, 2019 on Nippon Television Network System in Japan. The season was later collected and released in eight DVD compilations by Shogakukan between February 26, 2021 and September 24, 2021, in Japan. Crunchyroll began simulcasting the series in October 2014, starting with episode 754.



Episode list

Notes

References

Season 29
2019 Japanese television seasons